is a 2006 Japanese anime television series based on a manga series by Ryoutarou Iwanaga of the same name. The series was produced by Gonzo and AIC, directed by Katsuhito Akiyama. It was broadcast in 24 episodes on Tokyo MX between October 2, 2006 and March 17, 2007. It is licensed by Funimation.

The show began airing in English on Animax Asia from May 21, 2010 to June 23, 2010.

Episode list 

{|class="wikitable" style="width:98%; margin:auto; background:#FFF;"
|- style="border-bottom: 3px solid #FF7518"
! width="30"  | #
! Title
! width="125" | Original airdate
! width="125" | English airdate
|-

|}

References 

Lists of anime episodes